Eduardo Teixeira may refer to:

Eduardo Teixeira Coelho (1919–2005), Portuguese comic book artist
Eduardo V. Teixeira, Brazilian mathematician
Eduardo Teixeira (born 1993), Brazilian footballer